C. Canby Balderston (February 1, 1897 – September 9, 1979) was an American economist, lawyer and businessman who served as the 7th vice chairman of the Federal Reserve from 1955 to 1966. Prior to his term as vice chairman, Balderston served as a member of the Federal Reserve Board of Governors, taking office in 1954.

He died on September 9, 1979, in Media, Pennsylvania at age 82.

References

1897 births
1979 deaths
20th-century American businesspeople
Eisenhower administration personnel
Lyndon B. Johnson administration personnel
Kennedy administration personnel
People from Kennett Square, Pennsylvania
Vice Chairs of the Federal Reserve